Carl Reiser (5 June 1877 – 17 June 1950) was a German painter. His work was part of the painting event in the art competition at the 1936 Summer Olympics.

References

1877 births
1950 deaths
20th-century German painters
20th-century German male artists
German male painters
Olympic competitors in art competitions
People from Garmisch-Partenkirchen